Marshall-Smith Syndrome, discovered in 1971 (Marshall, Graham, Scott, Boner, & Smith), is characterized by unusual accelerated skeletal maturation (usually starting before birth) and symptoms like conspicuous physical characteristics, respiratory difficulties, and mental retardation. Cases described in the literature show a clinical variability regarding related symptoms. For instance, respiratory difficulties are ranging from absent to severe difficulties.

Presentation

The syndrome is a rare clinical disorder.
 Physical
 Overgrowth
 Accelerated skeletal maturation
 Dysmorphic facial features
 Prominent eyes
 Bluish sclerae
 Coarse eyebrows
 Upturned nose
 Radiologic examination
 Accelerated osseous maturation
 Phalangeal abnormalities
 Tubular thinning of the long bones
 Skull abnormalities
 Mental
 Often associated with intellectual disability (of variable degree)

Genotype
The first gene - NFIX - that could cause the syndrome has been identified. This gene is located on the short arm of chromosome 19 (19p13.1).

Diagnosis
 Clinical course
 Respiratory difficulties (like upper airway obstruction. (Note regarding clinical variability: respiratory difficulties might be absent.)
 Pneumonia
 Failure to thrive
 Psychomotor retardation

Respiratory complications are often cause of death in early infancy.

Differential diagnosis
Marshall–Smith syndrome is not to be confused with:
 Marshall syndrome
 Sotos (like) syndrome (Malan syndrome) 
 Weaver-Smith syndrome (WSS)

Terminology

Translated
 English: Marshall–Smith syndrome
 Español: Síndrome de Marshall–Smith
 Français: Le syndrome de Marshall–Smith
 Italiano: Sindrome di Marshall–Smith
 Nederlands: Marshall–Smithsyndroom, syndroom van Marshall–Smith
 Polski: Zespół Marshalla–Smitha, Zespół Marshalla i Smitha
 Русский: Синдром Маршалла–Смита

References

Further reading

 
 Adam, M., Hennekam, R.C.M., Butler, M.G., Raf, M., Keppen, L., Bull, M., Clericuzio, C., Burke, L., Guttacher, A., Ormond, K., & Hoyme, H.E. (2002). Marshall–Smith syndrome: An osteochondrodysplasia with connective tissue abnormalities. 23rd Annual David W. Smith Workshop on Malformations and Morphogenesis, August 7, Clemson, SC.
 Adam MP, Hennekam RC, Keppen LD, Bull MJ, Clericuzio CL, Burke LW, Guttmacher AE, Ormond KE and Hoyme HE: Marshall-Smith Syndrome:  Natural history and evidence of an osteochondrodysplasia with connective tissue abnormalities. American Journal of Medical Genetics 137A:117–124, 2005.
 .
 
 Baldellou Vazquez A, Ruiz-Echarri Zelaya MP, Loris Pablo C, Ferr#{225}ndez Longas A, Tamparillas Salvador M. El sIndrome de Marshall-Smith: a prop#{243}sito de una observad#{243}n personal. An Esp Pediatr 1983; 18:45-50.
 Butler, M.G. (2003).  Marshall–Smith syndrome.  In: The NORD Guide to Rare Disorders. (pp219–220) Lippincott, Williams & Wilkins, Philadelphia, PA.
 
 Charon A, Gillerot T, Van Maldergem L, Van Schaftingen MH, de Bont B, Koulischer L. The Marshall–Smith syndrome. Eur J Pediatr 1990; 150: 54–5.
 
 Dernedde, G., Pendeville, P., Veyckemans, F., Verellen, G. & Gillerot, Y. (1998). Anaesthetic management of a child with Marshall–Smith syndrome. Canadian Journal of Anesthesia. 45 (7): 660. Anaesthetic management of a child with Marshall-Smith syndrome
 
 Diab, M., Raff, M., Gunther, D.F. (2002). Osseous fragility in Marshall–Smith syndrome. Clinical Report: Osseous fragility in Marshall-Smith syndrome
 Ehresmann, T., Gillessen-Kaesbach G., Koenig R. (2005). Late diagnosis of Marshall Smith Syndrome (MSS). In: Medgen 17. 
 
 Hassan M, Sutton T, Mage K, LimalJM, Rappaport R. The syndrome of accelerated bone maturation in the newborn infant with dysmorphism and congenital malformations: (the so-called Marshall–Smith syndrome). Pediatr Radiol 1976; 5:53-57.
 
 Hoyme HE and Bull MJ: The Marshall-Smith Syndrome: Natural history beyond infancy. Western Society for Pediatric Research, Carmel, California, February, 1987. Clin Res 35:68A, 1987.
 Hoyme HE and Bull MJ: The Marshall-Smith Syndrome:  Natural history beyond infancy. David W. Smith Morphogenesis and Malformations Workshop.  Greenville, SC, August, 1987. Proceedings of the Greenwood Genetics Center 7:152, 1988.
 Hoyme HE, Byers PH, Guttmacher AE:  Marshall–Smith syndrome: Further evidence of an osteochondrodysplasia in long-term survivors.  David W. Smith Morphogenesis and Malformations Workshop, Winston-Salem, NC, August, 1992.  Proceedings of the Greenwood Genetic Center 12:70, 1993.
 
 
 
 
 
 
 
 .
 
 Tzu-Jou Wang (2002). Marshall–Smith syndrome in a Taiwanese patient with T-cell immunodeficiency. Am J Med Genet Part A;112 (1):107-108.

External links 

 clinical synopsis at Online Mendelian Inheritance in Man (OMIM).

Syndromes with intellectual disability
Syndromes affecting bones
Rare syndromes